Countryman is the 53rd studio album by Willie Nelson. Ten years in the making since 1995, Nelson's first ever reggae album merges the gospel and spirit found in both country and reggae. It was released on CD format on August 2, 2005 by the Lost Highway label. Nelson made two videos for this album "The Harder They Come" and "I'm a Worried Man", both videos were filmed in Jamaica.

Track listing

Personnel
 Sweet Pea Atkinson - vocals
 Dan Bosworth - guitar
 Harry Bowens - vocals
 Santa Davis - drums
 Richard Feldman - guitar
 Pam Hall - vocals
 Mikey Hyde - keyboards 
 Randy Jacobs - guitar
 Wayne Jobson - guitar
 Donald Ray Mitchell - vocals
 Mickey Raphael - harmonica
 Paul "Pablo" Stennett - bass
 Stephen Stewart - keyboards
 Lieba Thomas - vocals
 Uziah Thompson - percussion 
 Robby Turner -pedal steel guitar, resonator guitar
 Norris Webb - keyboards

Chart performance

References

2005 albums
Willie Nelson albums
Lost Highway Records albums
Reggae albums by American artists